Alexander Howard may refer to:

 Alex T. Howard Jr. (1924–2011), United States district judge
 Alexander Howard, Viscount Andover (born 1974)